C/2017 T2 (PanSTARRS) is an Oort cloud comet discovered on 2 October 2017 when it was  from the Sun. It came to perihelion (closest approach to the Sun) on 4 May 2020 when it was safe from disintegration at 1.6 AU from the Sun. (Mars is also roughly 1.6 AU from the Sun.)

Comet C/2017 T2 (PanSTARRS) brightened to apparent magnitude 8 and was visible with 50mm binoculars. On 22-24 May 2020, the comet passed near the galaxy pair of Messier 81 and Messier 82, passing less than one degree from the latter. In early June 2020 the comet was near the magnitude 1.8 star Dubhe in Ursa Major.

Based on the light curve of the comet nucleus, it has been estimated that the nucleus has a rotational period of 5.6759 ± 0.0046 h. The comet at perihelion had a water production of 6×1028 molecules/s. Also when observed in CN featured two side jets in June 2020, but they weren't observed one month later. Concentric structures were observed in the inner coma in May 2020, probably created by a jet with rotation axis towards the Earth.

References
 

20171002
Comets in 2020
Oort cloud
Discoveries by Pan-STARRS